Between Ourselves is an Australian television variety series which aired on ABC. The first episode aired on 20 June 1963, and the final episode aired 19 September 1963.

The cast included Johnny Ladd, Tikki Taylor, Bill Newman, Kevan Johnston, Jillian Hough, Joan Clarke, and Phil Lanham. Episodes of the series may be held by the National Film and Sound Archive as kinescope recordings.

References

External links
Between Ourselves on IMDb

1963 Australian television series debuts
1963 Australian television series endings
Black-and-white Australian television shows
English-language television shows
Australian variety television shows
Australian Broadcasting Corporation original programming